Oumar Traoré (born 27 February 1975) is a Senegalese former professional footballer who played as a midfielder. He made 25 appearances for the Senegal national team from 1996 to 2000. He was also named in Senegal's squad for the 2000 African Cup of Nations tournament.

References

1975 births
Living people
Senegalese footballers
Association football midfielders
Senegal international footballers
Cypriot First Division players
ASC Jaraaf players
Al-Riyadh SC players
AEK Larnaca FC players
Senegalese expatriate footballers
Senegalese expatriate sportspeople in Saudi Arabia
Expatriate footballers in Saudi Arabia
Senegalese expatriate sportspeople in Cyprus
Expatriate footballers in Cyprus
Place of birth missing (living people)